Joanne Boyle (born November 1, 1963) is the former head coach of the University of Virginia women's basketball team. Prior to joining the Cavaliers, Boyle served as the head coach of the  California Golden Bears women's basketball team. Boyle played her collegiate basketball for the Duke Blue Devils basketball program.

Playing career
Boyle, a four-year letterwinner at Duke, graduated in 1985 with a degree in economics and obtained a Master of Science degree in health policy and administration from North Carolina in 1989. She ended her playing career ranked second at Duke in both scoring and in assists. Her 75 steals during the 1984-85 campaign remained the highest single-season total until Alana Beard broke the mark in 2000–01. After Duke University, Boyle played professional basketball overseas for three years in Luxembourg and Germany. During her European stay, she won two league championships.

Duke statistics
Source

Coaching career
Boyle was hired at Cal on April 15, 2005, after serving three seasons as head coach at Richmond. While at California, her teams emerged as one of the Pac-10's statistical leaders. In 2007–08, Cal ranked among the top-five teams in 13 categories for the second straight season and was No. 1 in four areas. For the third consecutive year, Cal established school records for field goal percentage defense (35.1%, 1st Pac-10) and scoring defense (54.3 ppg, all-time Pac-10 record). Cal's 155 three-pointers made in 2007–08 broke the previous school record of 135, established in 1995–96. During her first Cal season in 2005–06, Boyle led a freshman-dominated Bears team to an 18–12 overall record, a sixth-place showing in the Pac-10 (10–8) and the school's first NCAA Tournament bid since 1993.

During the 2009–10 season, Boyle guided the Bears to their first title in the WNIT, defeating the Miami Hurricanes 73–61 at the Bears' home court in Haas Pavilion.

On April 2, 2010, USA Basketball announced that Boyle was appointed to its board of directors for 2009–2012. The committee is responsible for selecting coaches and athletes for USA Basketball college-aged competitions including the U19 FIBA World Championships.

On March 20, 2018, Boyle announced her retirement from coaching after seven years as the head coach of the University of Virginia's women's team. She initially cited an undisclosed family matter, which she later revealed to The Washington Post as issues relating to her ongoing attempt to finalize the adoption of her 6-year-old Senegalese daughter Ngoty. At the time of her retirement, Boyle was preparing to return to Senegal with her daughter for required paperwork, a process that was expected to take a minimum of several months but could possibly last years. After a total of 15 trips to Senegal, Boyle was able to finalize the adoption, and Ngoty entered the U.S. permanently on August 30, 2019.

Head Coaching Record

Career highlights
 2007–08 Russell Athletic/WBCA Region 8 Coach of the Year and 2006-07 Pac-10 Coach of the Year
 Joined Gooch Foster (1991–92) and Caren Horstmeyer (2003–04) as Cal's women's basketball coaches who earned Pac-10 Coach of the Year
 Cal's 68 wins in three seasons under Joanne Boyle are more than the Bears posted in the previous six years (63) prior to her arrival in Berkeley.
 Owns the best winning percentage (.708) of any of the eight women's basketball coaches in Cal history
 Surpassed the 1983-84 Bears (24-8) for the school record for wins in a season in 2007-08 (27-7)
 Directed Cal to the best Pac-10 finish (2nd) and to the Bears' best Pac-10 record (15-3) in program history in 2007-08
In 2007-08, led Cal to the Pac-10 Tournament final for the first time and a school-best No. 8 national ranking in the Associated Press and coaches' polls
Guided Cal to five ranked wins in three seasons, including a victory over No. 8 Stanford in 2006-07 and No. 18 Vanderbilt in 2007-08
 Coached the 2006-07 Pac-10 Player of the Year (Devanei Hampton) and the 2005-06 Pac-10 Freshman of the Year (Alexis Gray-Lawson)
 Her players have earned All-Pac-10 honors eight times and Pac-10 All-Freshman accolades seven times
 Coached two All-Americans (Devanei Hampton and Ashley Walker)
 2006 USA Under-20 National team assistant coach 
2010 WNIT Champion

Health
In November 2001, while an assistant coach at Duke University, Boyle suffered a cerebral hemorrhage. She made a recovery, and returned to coaching in early 2002.

Awards and honors
 2007-08 Russell Athletic/WBCA Region 8 Coach of the Year
 Member of the WBCA Board of Directors 
 2011—Carol Eckman Award

References

External links 
 Official bio
 Cal bio

1963 births
Living people
Duke Blue Devils women's basketball coaches
Duke Blue Devils women's basketball players
Richmond Spiders women's basketball coaches
Virginia Cavaliers women's basketball coaches
American women's basketball coaches
California Golden Bears women's basketball coaches